Southern Maryland is a geographical, cultural and historic region in Maryland composed of the state's southernmost counties on the Western Shore of the Chesapeake Bay. According to the state of Maryland, the region includes all of Calvert, Charles, and St. Mary's counties and the southern portions of Anne Arundel and Prince George's counties. It is largely coterminous with the region of Maryland that is part of the Washington metropolitan area.

Southern Maryland is considered by historians to be the birthplace of religious freedom in North America.

Geography 
The region's northern boundary passes through Prince George's County and Anne Arundel County, east of Washington. Its eastern boundary is the Chesapeake Bay and its southern and western boundary is the Potomac River, Maryland's boundary with Virginia (and through it, the Northern Neck).

History

Native Americans and first contact with the British

Southern Maryland was originally inhabited by the indigenous Piscataway people. Captain John Smith explored the area in 1608 and 1609.

The early Maryland colony

The colony originally focused on tobacco farming and was very successful although disease was a problem and many settlers died until immunities built up in the population. Religious tensions and also periods of open conflict also continued to be a major challenge.

St. Mary's City is widely considered to be the birthplace of religious freedom in North America. The colony there started under a mandate of religious tolerance in a time when England was anything but religiously tolerant. There was still much religious strife in St. Mary's City that led to the passage of one of the earliest laws requiring religious tolerance which was written and passed there by the Maryland colonial assembly.

The fall of St. Mary's City

After 61 years as Maryland's capital an uprising of Protestants put an end to religious tolerance, overthrowing the old Catholic leadership and putting an end to colonial St. Mary's City itself, moving the colonial capital to Annapolis.

Plantation economy and slavery

St. Mary's City was abandoned as a capitol but was slowly consolidated from smaller farms into a large, single slave plantation by the late 1600s., Tobacco and later, also wheat plantations, expanded there and in Southern Maryland as a whole during the slavery era.

Civil War
During the American Civil War, wartime sympathies were divided in Maryland and Southern Maryland was sympathetic to the Confederates next to Maryland's Eastern Shore. From the war's beginning, however, large numbers of Union occupying troops and patrolling river gunboats prevented the state's secession, although frequent nighttime smuggling across the Potomac River with Virginia took place, including of Maryland men volunteering for Confederate service. John Wilkes Booth was helped by several people in his escape through the area and in crossing the river after killing President Abraham Lincoln. Thousands of captured Confederate troops were confined in harsh conditions at Point Lookout prison camp at the southern tip of the peninsula.

Transition to modern era
Southern Maryland was traditionally a rural, agricultural, oyster fishing and crabbing region; linked by passenger and freight steamboat routes. These steamboat routes operated on the Chesapeake Bay and major rivers until the 1930s before the building of highways and the Harry W. Nice Memorial Bridge on U.S. Highway 301. (The latter highway was named after Robert Crain, an attorney who owned the state's largest farm, Mount Victoria, and who campaigned for the road's construction). Weekend excursion boats also carried Washingtonians to small amusement parks and amusement pavilions at numerous Potomac shore locations. From 1949 (1943 in some places) to 1968, the region was known for its poverty and its slot machine gambling.

Raley's campaign to modernize St. Mary's County 

There was a lot of rural poverty at the time, and the gambling came to be seen as a blight and was finally outlawed by Governor J. Millard Tawes and the state legislature. A local political figure, St. Mary's County politician J. Frank Raley Jr. organized a slate of local candidates with the platform of challenging the old political machine and lifting the region out of its generations long poverty.

Raley led the way in ending the region's isolation by having a series of bridges built and roads expanded into highways. Raley is largely credited for enabling the development of modern St. Mary's County.

He was falsely accused of working to end gambling outright in the region, which ended in his defeat and his official political career. In fact he had supported a referendum on gambling which would have put the decision directly in the hands of voters. He continued nevertheless lobbying on behalf of the Southern Maryland region and sitting on development boards and so continued to have a major influence in favor of economic development in the region for the rest of his life.

Population and economy

During recent times, the region experienced suburban development as the Washington suburbs expanded southward. This expansion took place primarily in Prince George's County, and around Waldorf (a regional shopping hub) and St. Charles (a planned community in Charles County), Lexington Park (St. Mary's County) and Prince Frederick (Calvert County). However, as noted, land-use maps show that the area is still primarily low-density.

Many southern Marylanders work at Andrews Air Force Base, the U.S. Census Bureau or at Patuxent River Naval Air Station and its related industries. Other smaller industries include a nuclear power plant and a liquified natural gas terminal (both in Lusby), a Naval ordnance test ground (at Indian Head), electric power plants (at Aquasco and Morgantown) and an oil terminal (at Piney Point). The beautiful towns of Solomons Island and Chesapeake Beach are favorite weekend tourist resorts. Maryland International Raceway and Budds Creek Raceway near Chaptico attract many auto and motocross racing enthusiasts.

While the steamboats are long gone, more than three-quarters of the land area is still rural, a mixture of forest and farmland.

Military bases

Southern Maryland has seven military bases.

 Patuxent River Naval Air Station, Lexington Park, St. Mary's County, home of the national test pilot school and place where the F-35 fighter aircraft was developed.
 Joint Base Andrews (Andrews Air Force Base), Camp Springs, in southern Prince Georges County, home of Air Force One and Marine One, aircraft for the president of the United States
 Indian Head Naval Surface Warfare Center, Indian Head, Charles County, national munitions research and development center
 Webster Field, St. Inigoes, St. Mary's County, aircraft research and development, training field for test pilots
 US Military Reserve Globecom Radio Receiving Station, classified base in Brandywine, Maryland, linked by encoded radio to the White House, Air Force One, the Department of Defense Command and worldwide nuclear submarines via satellite in case of nuclear war, for security reasons the base does not appear on Google Maps
 Coast Guard Station Cove Point, Calvert County and Coast Guard Station St. Inigoes, St. Mary's County; public safety and rescue, law enforcement and fisheries enforcement for area waters

Northern areas of Southern Maryland also have many Pentagon, Crystal City, Virginia and US Naval Academy related commuters.

Tourism 
The Southern Maryland National Heritage Area was established in the National Heritage Area Act in 2022. The National Heritage Area will help preserve and promote destinations in four counties.

Food and cuisine 
Oysters are still widely available although they were once fished from the bay and it's tidal tributaries in greater numbers, and are served either fried, raw, or stuffed. "Rockfish", the Maryland word for striped bass, is considered the most prized fish dish in Southern Maryland.

Perhaps the most notable food dish originating from Southern Maryland is stuffed ham, which includes cabbage, kale, onions, spices and seasonings that are chopped and mixed, then stuffed into deep slits slashed in a whole, corned ham.

Sports 

Many residents also identify with national sports teams in Washington DC or Baltimore.

Colleges 
Colleges in Southern Maryland include:
 The College of Southern Maryland, a 2-year community college with campuses in Charles, Calvert, and St. Mary's counties
 St. Mary's College of Maryland, in St. Mary's County - a 4-year public honors college with some graduate school offerings.

Notable Southern Marylanders 

 Rep. Steny Hoyer member of the Democratic Party, House Majority Leader of the United States House of Representatives, (used to be House Minority Whip) represents southern Maryland as the representative for Maryland's 5th congressional district. He lives in Mechanicsville.
 Jerome Adams, Surgeon General of the United States, was born in Mechanicsville and graduated from Chopticon High School.
 Two former first ladies hail from southern Maryland: Louisa Catherine Johnson Adams, wife of John Quincy Adams, and Margaret Mackall Smith Taylor, wife of Zachary Taylor.
 Co-discover of the North Pole, Matthew Henson and Captain Raphael Semmes of the CSS Alabama were born near Nanjemoy, Charles County. Prominent revolutionary war statesmen John Hanson, Thomas Stone, and General Smallwood were from Charles County. Dr. Samuel Mudd, convicted of conspiracy to murder in the Abraham Lincoln assassination, was also a native of Charles County.
 Television journalists Ted Koppel, Judy Woodruff, Al Hunt, newspapermen Ben Bradlee and Sally Quinn, and weatherman Doug Hill all have houses in St. Mary's County.
 Theoretical ecologist Dr. Robert Ulanowicz lived in Calvert County prior to his retirement in 2008 with Chesapeake Biological Laboratory in Solomons, where he was a member of the faculty.
 Roger B. Taney, the Chief Justice of the United States who presided over the Dred Scott decision, was born in Calvert County near Prince Frederick.
 Former Comptroller of Maryland Louis L. Goldstein lived in Calvert County. A portion of MD 2/MD 4 in Calvert County was renamed in his honor after his death.
 Arthur Storer, first astronomer in the American colonies and the original namesake for Halley's Comet, lived the latter part of his life in Calvert County. A planetarium in Prince Frederick bears his name.
Thomas Johnson, the first elected governor of Maryland and Associate Justice of the Supreme Court of the United States. The Governor Thomas Johnson Bridge connecting Calvert and St. Mary's counties was named in his honor.
Television and film screenwriter and producer Alfred Gough hails from Leonardtown in St. Mary's County.
 Former Maryland State Senator and Patuxent River advocate Bernie Fowler lives in Calvert County. Every year, in Broomes Island Fowler will hold a "wade-in" with other public officials to help determine the clarity levels of the Patuxent.
 Singer Christina Milian once lived in Waldorf.
 Joel and Benji Madden from the band Good Charlotte grew up in Waldorf.
 Turkey Tayac, Piscataway tribal leader and herbal medicine man
 Robert Stethem, murder victim during hijacking of TWA Flight 847 was from Pinefield, the northern section of Waldorf
 Senator and astronaut John Glenn trained at Patuxent River Naval Air Station many years ago, as did Alan Shepard and other future astronauts.
 Dashiell Hammett, author of hard-boiled detective novels (creator of the "Maltese Falcon" and "The Thin Man") and short stories, and a screenplay writer, was born in St. Mary's County.
 Danny Gatton, guitarist, resided in Accokeek and Newburg.
 Eva Cassidy, interpretive vocalist and guitarist, lived in Oxon Hill and Bowie.
 Link Wray, pioneering rock guitarist, lived in Accokeek.
 Professional wrestler and WWE Hall of Famer Scott Hall was born in St. Mary's County.

References 

 
Regions of Maryland